The molecular formula C15H19NO (molar mass: 229.32 g/mol, exact mass: 229.1467 u) may refer to:

 Pronethalol (Alderlin, Nethalide)
 Furfenorex, or furfurylmethylamphetamine

Molecular formulas